Hollywood style may refer to:

The style of Classical Hollywood cinema
The Hollywood-style Lindy Hop